Lihou can refer to:
Lihou, a small island off the coast of Guernsey, in the English Channel
Lihou Reef National Nature Reserve in the Australian Coral Sea Islands Territory
Port Lihou Island in the Torres Straits between Australia and Papua New Guinea